is a 1997 Japanese comedy film directed by Yōjirō Takita and starring the rock band Sharam Q. It was released on 30 August 1997.

Cast
Tsunku as Rannosuke Amakusa
Hatake as Haruo
Takanori Jinnai as Hideto Kuroi
Asaka Seto as Tamami Naruto
Isao Bitō as Ichiro Misaki
Masako Motoi as President Koike
Takashi Matsuo as Manager
Chisato Moritaka as Herself
 Ken Takayama as Himself
 Seiko Mineko as Seiko Matsuda
 Shu as Ryo
 Makoto as Masato
 Taisei as Hanyu
 Kenji Kawabata as Ana Kawabata
 Rika Sato as Ana Sato
 Miki Tominaga as New Singer
 Mikijirō Hira as Daisuke Naruto

Release
Sharam Q no Enka no Hanamichi was distributed theatrically in Japan by Toho on August 30, 1997.

Reception
The film was chosen as the seventh best film at the 19th Yokohama Film Festival.

References

Sources

External links

1997 comedy films
1997 films
Films directed by Yōjirō Takita
Japanese comedy films
1990s Japanese films